For the genus of sponge, see Amphimedon (sponge)

In Homer's Odyssey, Amphimedon was the Ithacan son of Melaneus and one of the suitors of Penelope.

Mythology 
While retreating from Odysseus's party during the final stages of the battle in the latter's hall, Amphimedon gave a glancing blow to the carapace of Telemachus, to whom he fell shortly afterwards. In the Underworld, he told the story of the suitors' slaughter by Odysseus and Telemachus.

Notes

References 

 Apollodorus, The Library with an English Translation by Sir James George Frazer, F.B.A., F.R.S. in 2 Volumes, Cambridge, MA, Harvard University Press; London, William Heinemann Ltd. 1921. ISBN 0-674-99135-4. Online version at the Perseus Digital Library. Greek text available from the same website.
 Homer, The Odyssey with an English Translation by A.T. Murray, PH.D. in two volumes. Cambridge, MA., Harvard University Press; London, William Heinemann, Ltd. 1919. . Online version at the Perseus Digital Library. Greek text available from the same website.

Suitors of Penelope
Characters in the Odyssey
Ithacan characters in Greek mythology